Parvez Jamil Mir (born September 24, 1953, Sutrapur, Dacca, East Pakistan) is a Pakistani TV anchor and former professional cricketer who played in the Central Lancashire Leagues for Crompton CC, and in the Bolton League for Egerton, Walkden and Kearsley Cricket Clubs. In  amateur club cricket he has played for Vauxhall Mallards, Ingham, and Horsford Cricket Clubs in Norfolk.

Mir is a journalist and has interviewed many prominent Pakistani politicians and international celebrities. Mir hosts current affairs talk show Q & A With PJ Mir.

His cricket career included three One Day Internationals for Pakistan, two of those appearances at the 1975 World Cup, as well as 80 first-class matches for various teams in Pakistan and England.

He has also been the Media Manager of Pakistan's cricket team at the 2007 Cricket World Cup.

References 

Living people
Pakistan One Day International cricketers
Derbyshire cricketers
Glamorgan cricketers
Habib Bank Limited cricketers
Cricketers at the 1975 Cricket World Cup
1953 births
Norfolk cricketers
Pakistani cricketers
Cricketers from Dhaka
Cricketers from Lahore
Lahore A cricketers
Lahore City cricketers
Lahore City Blues cricketers
Lahore City Whites cricketers
Pakistan Universities cricketers
Punjab A cricketers
Punjab (Pakistan) cricketers
Pakistani people of Bangladeshi descent